A Kiss from the Stadium is a 1948 Czech comedy film directed by Martin Frič.

Cast
 Zdeněk Dítě as Jan Vaněček
 Jana Dítětová as Věra Fabiánová
 Svatopluk Beneš as Oldřich Janota
 Eman Fiala as Malík, accountant
 Irena Bernátová as Lídia Jonášová
 Marie Grossová as Ema Jonášová
 Oldřich Dědek as Kubiš, shop manager
 Josef Laufer
 Otakar Procházka
 Stefan Maslonka
 Jára Kohout
 Milena Spálená
 Ella Nollová
 George Pravda

References

External links
 

1948 films
1948 comedy films
1940s Czech-language films
Czechoslovak black-and-white films
Czechoslovak comedy films
Films directed by Martin Frič
1940s Czech films